Daniel Dor is an Israeli linguist, media researcher and political activist. He is a professor in the Dan Department of Communication in Tel Aviv University. He has written extensively on language and its evolution, as well as on the role of the media in the construction of political hegemony. His theory of language is described in The Instruction of Imagination: Language as a Social Communication Technology (2015).

Academic career

Dor received his PhD in linguistics from Stanford University in 1996. He started teaching in the Department of Communication in Tel Aviv University in 1998. Since 2000, he has published a series of articles with Eva Jablonka on the evolution of language, describing a complex co-evolutionary relationship cultural evolution of language as a technology and the cognitive and biological evolution of humans. In 2004, he published Intifada Hits the Headlines: How the Israeli Press misreported the Outbreak of the Second Palestinian Uprising, which was chosen as book of the year in communication by Choice Magazine. In 2014, he co-edited “The Social Origins of Language” with Chris Knight and Jerome Lewis. In 2015, he published The Instruction of Imagination: Language as a Social Communication Technology, which presented a new framework for the description and analysis of language and its evolution.

Activism

Between 2004 and 2007, Dor served as Chairman and Academic Supervisor of Keshev, the Center for the Protection of Democracy in Israel. In 2011, he founded together with Lia Nirgad The Social Guard, an NGO that maintains a civic presence in the Knesset, monitors the MKs work, and informs the public about every discussion bearing on issues of social justice in Israel.

Selected publications

Books

Articles

References

Year of birth missing (living people)
Living people
Stanford University alumni
Academic staff of Tel Aviv University
Linguists from Israel